Moezzabad-e Gurgir (also Romanized as Mo‘ezzābād-e Gūrgīr; also known as Gūgīr and Gūrgīr) is a village in Korbal Rural District, in the Central District of Kharameh County, Fars Province, Iran. At the 2006 census, its population was 1,230, in 311 families.

References 

Populated places in Kharameh County